Le Havre station (French: Gare du Havre) is the main railway station located in Le Havre, Seine-Maritime, France. The station was opened on 22 March 1847 and is located on the Paris–Le Havre railway. The train services are operated by SNCF.

The station building was built in 1932 by Henri Pacon for the CF de l'Etat replacing the older building along with a new clock tower. It is a terminus and the passenger hall is parallel to the street. Of the old building, only the rooftop by Juste Lisch remains.

Train services 
The station is served by the following services:
 High speed services (TGV) Le Havre - Rouen - Massy TGV - Lyon - Avignon - Marseille
 Regional services (TER Normandie) Le Havre - Rouen - Paris
 Regional services (TER Normandie) Le Havre - Bréauté-Beuzeville - Yvetot - Rouen
 Local services (TER Normandie) Le Havre - Bréauté-Beuzeville - Fécamp
 Local services (TER Normandie) Le Havre - Harfleur - Montivilliers (- Rolleville)

Tram services
The station is served by the Le Havre tramway, which has a tram stop outside the entrance of the station.
 A (La Plage - Hotel de Ville - Gare - Universite - Mare Rouge - Mont-Gaillard)
 B (La Plage - Hotel de Ville - Gare - Universite - Atrium - Caucriauville)

See also 

 List of SNCF stations in Normandy

References

External links 

 
  TER Normandie

Railway stations in Seine-Maritime
Buildings and structures in Le Havre
Railway stations in France opened in 1847